Libya–Malaysia relations refers to bilateral foreign relations between Libya and Malaysia. Libya has an embassy in Kuala Lumpur, and Malaysia has an embassy in Tripoli.

History 

Since the new Libyan government period, the relations between the two countries has been enhanced when Malaysia recognise the new government of National Transitional Council as the interim government of Libya on 26 August 2011.

Economic relations 
Libya looks to Malaysia as a model to expand their country's economy. At present, there are six Malaysian oil and gas companies operating in Libya and the country now seeks Malaysian assistance for more investment to develop their country since the country was destroyed in the Libyan Civil War. An agreement on air services were signed in 2009 and both countries agreed to formalise a memorandum of understanding on airlines. Libya also seeks co-operation with Malaysia in Islamic banking.

Education relations 
In education, approximately 1,000–1,200 Malaysian students are sponsored by the Libyan government to studied in Libya while 2,000 Libyan students will coming to Malaysia to do a vocational training.

Further reading 
 Celebrating Libya's Independence by Ricky Yap on New Straits Times

References 

 
Malaysia
Bilateral relations of Malaysia